St Mary's Church, Northop Hall is an Anglican congregation within the Parish of Northop, Northop Hall and Sychdyn, in the Deanery of Mold and the Diocese of St Asaph, the Church in Wales.

The church was built 1911–12 of a design by L.W. Barnard of Cheltenham, a prolific architect. The original design was to include a tower, but this was never fully built. A rather abbreviated top was only added in 1962.

Of particular note are the barrel ceiling and the organ which is of outstanding quality. The instrument was built in 1931 by Messrs. Rushworth & Dreaper, Liverpool and the opening recital was given by Dr. Middleton, then organist at Chester Cathedral. By utilising the reverberant acoustics of the church, the power of the organ is perfectly matched to the building into which it has been installed. To mark the 75th anniversary of its construction, well-attended organ recitals were given in 2006. The choristers of St. Asaph Cathedral also sang evensong in the church that year, accompanied by John Hosking on the organ.

References

External links
 The Parish of Northop, Northop Hall and Sychdyn

Churches in Flintshire
Churches completed in 1912
20th-century Church in Wales church buildings